Michigan's 110th House of Representatives district (also referred to as Michigan's 110th House district) is a legislative district within the Michigan House of Representatives located in part of Dickinson County, as well as all of Gogebic, Houghton, Iron, Keweenaw, and Ontonagon counties. The district was created in 1965, when the Michigan House of Representatives district naming scheme changed from a county-based system to a numerical one.

List of representatives

Recent Elections

Historical district boundaries

References 

Michigan House of Representatives districts
Baraga County, Michigan
Gogebic County, Michigan
Houghton County, Michigan
Iron County, Michigan
Keweenaw County, Michigan
Ontonagon County, Michigan
Marquette County, Michigan